Adotela bicolor is a species of beetle in the genus Adotela. It was first described by Francis de Laporte de Castelnau in 1867. Adotela bicolor is an endemic species found in Australia.

References

Broscini
Beetles of Australia
Taxa named by François-Louis Laporte, comte de Castelnau
Beetles described in 1867